International recognition of the State of Palestine has been the objective of the Palestine Liberation Organization (PLO) since the Palestinian Declaration of Independence formally established the de jure sovereign state on 15 November 1988 in Algiers, Algeria, at an extraordinary session in-exile of the Palestinian National Council. The declaration was promptly acknowledged by a range of countries, and by the end of the year, the proclaimed Palestinian state was recognized by over 78 countries.  of the  United Nations (UN) member states and two non-member states have recognized it (Israel is recognized by 165). Palestine also has been a non-member observer state of the UN General Assembly since the passing of United Nations General Assembly resolution 67/19 in November 2012.

As part of an attempt to resolve the ongoing Israeli–Palestinian conflict, the Oslo Accords signed between Israel and the PLO in 1993 and 1995 established the Palestinian National Authority (PNA) as a self-governing interim administration in Areas A and B of the West Bank and the Gaza Strip. After the Israeli disengagement from Gaza in 2005, the PNA held elections in 2006, in which Hamas won a governing majority of seats (74 of 132 seats). Following the Battle of Gaza in 2007, the PNA effectively split in two, with Hamas assuming control of the Gaza Strip and Fatah retaining control over Areas A and B of the West Bank; the Fatah–Hamas conflict is ongoing .

Among the G20, nine countries (Argentina, Brazil, China, India, Indonesia, Russia, Saudi Arabia, South Africa, and Turkey) have recognized Palestine as a state while ten countries (Australia, Canada, France, Germany, Italy, Japan, South Korea, Mexico, the United Kingdom, and the United States) have not. Although these countries generally support some form of two-state solution to the conflict, they take the position that their recognition of a Palestinian state is conditioned to direct negotiations between Israel and the PNA.

History

Background

On 22 November 1974, United Nations General Assembly Resolution 3236 recognised the right of the Palestinian people to self-determination, national independence and sovereignty in Palestine. It also recognised the PLO as the sole legitimate representative of the Palestinian people, and accorded it observer status in the United Nations. The designation "Palestine" for the PLO was adopted by the United Nations in 1988 in acknowledgment of the Palestinian declaration of independence, but the proclaimed state still has no formal status within the system.

Shortly after the 1988 declaration, the State of Palestine was recognised by many developing states in Africa and Asia, and from communist and non-aligned states. At the time, however, the United States was using its Foreign Assistance Act and other measures to discourage other countries and international organisations from extending recognition. Although these measures were successful in many cases, the Arab League and the Organisation of the Islamic Conference (OIC) immediately published statements of recognition of, support for, and solidarity with Palestine, which was accepted as a member state in both forums.

In February 1989 at the United Nations Security Council, the PLO representative acknowledged that 94 states had recognised the new Palestinian state. It subsequently attempted to gain membership as a state in several agencies connected to the United Nations, but its efforts were thwarted by U.S. threats to withhold funding from any organisation that admitted Palestine. For example, in April of the same year, the PLO applied for membership as a state in the World Health Organization, an application that failed to produce a result after the U.S. informed the organisation that it would withdraw funding if Palestine were admitted. In May, a group of OIC members submitted to UNESCO an application for membership on behalf of Palestine, and listed a total of 91 states that had recognised the State of Palestine.

In June 1989, the PLO submitted to the government of Switzerland letters of accession to the Geneva Conventions of 1949. However, Switzerland, as the depositary state, determined that because the question of Palestinian statehood had not been settled within the international community, it was therefore incapable of determining whether the letter constituted a valid instrument of accession.Due to the [uncertainty] within the international community as to the existence or the non-existence of a State of Palestine and as long as the issue has not been settled in an appropriate framework, the Swiss Government, in its capacity as depositary of the Geneva Conventions and their additional Protocols, is not in a position to decide whether this communication can be considered as an instrument of accession in the sense of the relevant provisions of the Conventions and their additional Protocols.

Consequently, in November 1989, the Arab League proposed a General Assembly resolution to formally recognise the PLO as the government of an independent Palestinian state. The draft, however, was abandoned when the U.S. again threatened to cut off its financing for the United Nations should the vote go ahead. The Arab states agreed not to press the resolution, but demanded that the U.S. promise not to threaten the United Nations with financial sanctions again.

Many of the early statements of recognition of the State of Palestine were termed ambiguously. In addition, hesitation from others did not necessarily mean that these nations did not regard Palestine as a state. This has seemingly resulted in confusion regarding the number of states that have officially recognized the state declared in 1988. Numbers reported in the past are often conflicting, with figures as high as 130 being seen frequently. In July 2011, in an interview with Haaretz, Palestinian ambassador to the United Nations, Riyad Mansour claimed that 122 states had so far extended formal recognition. At the end of the month, the PLO published a paper on why the world's governments should recognize the State of Palestine and listed the 122 countries that had already done so. By the end of September the same year, Mansour claimed the figure had reached 139.

Israeli position
Between the end of the Six-Day War and the Oslo Accords, no Israeli government proposed a Palestinian state. During Prime Minister Benjamin Netanyahu's government of 1996–1999, he accused the two previous governments of Rabin and Peres of bringing closer to realisation what he claimed to be the "danger" of a Palestinian state, and stated that his main policy goal was to ensure that the Palestinian Authority did not evolve beyond an autonomy.

In November 2001, Ariel Sharon was the first Israeli Prime Minister to proclaim that a Palestinian state was the solution to the conflict and the goal of his administration. The government headed by Ehud Olmert repeated the same objective. Following the inauguration of the present Netanyahu government in 2009, the government again claimed that a Palestinian state posed a danger for Israel. The government position changed, however, following pressure from the Obama administration, and on 14 June 2009, Netanyahu for the first time made a speech in which he supported the notion of a demilitarized and territorially reduced Palestinian state. This position met some criticism for its lack of commitment on the territories to be ceded to the Palestinian state in the future.

The Israeli government has accepted in general the idea that a Palestinian state is to be established, but has refused to accept the 1967 borders. Israeli military experts have argued that the 1967 borders are strategically indefensible. It also opposes the Palestinian plan of approaching the UN General Assembly on the matter of statehood, as it claims it does not honor the Oslo Accords agreement in which both sides agreed not to pursue unilateral moves.

Timeline of Palestine in the United Nations
On 14 October 1974, the Palestine Liberation Organization (PLO) was recognized by the UN General Assembly as the representative of the Palestinian people and granted the right to participate in the deliberations of the General Assembly on the question of Palestine in plenary meetings.
On 22 November 1974, the PLO was granted non-state observer status, allowing the PLO to participate in all Assembly sessions, as well as in other UN platforms.
On 15 December 1988, UN General Assembly Resolution 43/177 acknowledged the Palestinian Declaration of Independence of November 1988 and replaced the designation "Palestine Liberation Organization" with "Palestine" in the United Nations system.
On 23 September 2011, Palestinian President Mahmoud Abbas submitted an application for membership of Palestine in the United Nations.
On 29 November 2012, the General Assembly granted Palestine non-member observer state status in United Nations General Assembly resolution 67/19.
On 17 December 2012, UN Chief of Protocol Yeocheol Yoon decided that the constitutional name 'State of Palestine' shall be used by the Secretariat in all official United Nations documents.

Application for UN membership

After a two-year impasse in negotiations with Israel, the Palestinian Authority began a diplomatic campaign to gain recognition for the State of Palestine on the borders prior to the Six-Day War, with East Jerusalem as its capital. The efforts, which began in late 2009, gained widespread attention in September 2011, when President Mahmoud Abbas submitted an application to the United Nations to accept Palestine as a member state. This would have constituted collective recognition of the State of Palestine, which would have allowed its government to pursue legal claims against other states in international courts.

In order for a state to gain membership in the General Assembly, its application must have the support of two-thirds of member states with a prior recommendation for admission from the Security Council. This requires the absence of a veto from any of the Security Council's five permanent members. At the prospect of a veto from the United States, Palestinian leaders signalled that they might opt instead for a more limited upgrade to "non-member state" status, which requires only a simple majority in the General Assembly but provides the Palestinians with the recognition they desired.

The campaign, dubbed "Palestine 194", was supported by the Arab League in May, and was officially confirmed by the PLO on 26 June. The decision was labelled by the Israeli government as a unilateral step, while the Palestinian government countered that it was essential to overcoming the current impasse. Several other countries—such as Germany and Canada—also denounced the decision and called for a prompt return to negotiations. However, many others—such as Norway and Russia—endorsed the plan, as did Secretary-General Ban Ki-moon, who stated: "UN members are entitled whether to vote for or against the Palestinian statehood recognition at the UN."

Diplomatic efforts to gain support for the bid gained momentum following a succession of endorsements from South America in early 2011. High-level delegations led by Yasser Abed Rabbo, Riyad al-Maliki, Saeb Erekat, Nabil Shaath and Riyad Mansour paid visits to many states. Palestinian ambassadors, assisted by those of other Arab states, were charged with enlisting the support of the governments to which they were accredited. During the lead-up to the vote, Russia, China, and Spain publicly pledged their support for the Palestinian bid, as did inter-governmental organisations such as the African Union, and the Non-Aligned Movement.

Israel took steps to counter the initiative, and Germany, Italy, Canada and the U.S. announced publicly that they would vote against the resolution. Israeli and U.S. diplomats began a campaign pressuring many countries to oppose or abstain from the vote. However, because of the "automatic majority" enjoyed by the Palestinians in the General Assembly, the Netanyahu administration stated that it did not expect to prevent a resolution from passing should it go ahead. In August, Haaretz quoted the Israeli ambassador to the United Nations, Ron Prosor, as stating that Israel would be unable to block a resolution at the General Assembly by September. "The maximum that we can hope to gain is for a group of states who will abstain or be absent during the vote", wrote Prosor. "Only a few countries will vote against the Palestinian initiative."

Instead, the Israeli government focused on obtaining a "moral majority" of major democratic powers, in an attempt to diminish the weight of the vote. Considerable weight was placed on the position of the European Union, which had not yet been announced. EU foreign policy chief Catherine Ashton stated that it was likely to depend on the wording of the resolution. At the end of August, Israel's defence minister Ehud Barak said that "it is very important that all the players come up with a text that will emphasize the quick return to negotiations, without an effort to impose pre-conditions on the sides."

Efforts from both Israel and the U.S. also focused on pressuring the Palestinian leadership to abandon its plans and return to negotiations. In the U.S., Congress passed a bill denouncing the initiative and calling on the Obama administration to veto any resolution that would recognize a Palestinian state declared outside of an agreement negotiated by the two parties. A similar bill was passed in the Senate, which also threatened a withdrawal of aid to the West Bank. In late August, another congressional bill was introduced which proposes to block U.S. government funding for United Nations entities that support Palestinian membership in the UN. Several top U.S. officials, including ambassador to the United Nations Susan Rice and consul-general in Jerusalem Daniel Rubinstein, made similar threats. In the same month, it was reported that the Israeli Ministry of Finance was withholding its monthly payments to the PNA. Foreign Minister Avigdor Lieberman warned that if Palestine took unilateral action, Israel would consider the Oslo Accords null and void, and would break off relations with the PA.

On 11 July 2011, the Quartet met to discuss a return to negotiations, but the meeting produced no result. President Mahmoud Abbas claimed that he would suspend the bid and return to negotiations if the Israelis agreed to the 1967 borders and ceased the expansion of settlements in the West Bank.

The PNA's campaign saw an increasing level of support in grass-roots activism. Avaaz began an online petition urging all United Nations members to endorse the bid to admit Palestine; it reportedly attained 500,000 e-signatures in its first four days. OneVoice Palestine launched a domestic campaign in partnership with local news agencies, with the aim of getting the involvement and support of Palestinian citizens. Overseas, campaigns were launched in several nations, calling on their governments to vote "yes" in the resolution. On 7 September, a group of Palestinian activists under the banner "Palestine: State No. 194" staged a demonstration outside the United Nations' office in Ramallah. During the demonstration, they submitted to the office a letter addressed to Secretary-General Ban Ki-moon, urging him to "exert all possible efforts toward the achievement of the Palestinian people's just demands". The following day, Ban told reporters: "I support ... the statehood of Palestinians; an independent, sovereign state of Palestine. It has been long overdue", but he also stated that "recognition of a state is something to be determined by the member states."

Other United Nations organs had previously expressed readiness to see a Palestinian state. In April 2011, the UN's co-ordinator for the Middle East peace process issued a report on the Palestinian Authority's state-building progress, describing "aspects of its administration as sufficient for an independent state". It echoed a similar assessment published the week prior by the International Monetary Fund. The World Bank released a report in September 2010 that found the Palestinian Authority "well-positioned to establish a state" at any point in the near future. However, the report highlighted that, unless private-sector growth in the Palestinian economy was stimulated, a Palestinian state would remain donor dependent.

Non-member observer state status

During September 2012, Palestine decided to pursue an upgrade in status from "observer entity" to "non-member observer state". On 27 November of the same year, it was announced that the appeal had been made officially and would be put to a vote in the General Assembly on 29 November, where the status upgrade was expected to be supported by a majority of states. In addition to granting Palestine "non-member observer state status", the draft resolution "expresses the hope that the Security Council will consider favorably the application submitted on 23 September 2011 by the State of Palestine for admission to full membership in the United Nations, endorses the two state solution based on the pre-1967 borders, and stresses the need for an immediate resumption of negotiations between the two parties."

On 29 November 2012, in a 138–9 vote (with 41 abstaining) General Assembly resolution 67/19 passed, upgrading Palestine to "non-member observer state" status in the United Nations. The new status equated Palestine's with that of the Holy See. The change in status was described by The Independent as "de facto recognition of the sovereign state of Palestine". Voting "no" were Israel, Canada, the Czech Republic, the Marshall Islands, the Federated States of Micronesia, Nauru, Palau, Panama and the United States.

The vote was an important benchmark for the partially recognized State of Palestine and its citizens, while it was a diplomatic setback for Israel and the United States. Status as an observer state in the UN allows the State of Palestine to join treaties and specialized UN agencies, the Law of the Seas treaty, and the International Criminal Court. It permits Palestine to pursue legal rights over its territorial waters and air space as a sovereign state recognized by the UN, and allows the Palestinian people the right to sue for sovereignty over their territory in the International Court of Justice and to bring "crimes against humanity" and war-crimes charges, including that of unlawfully occupying the territory of State of Palestine, against Israel in the International Criminal Court.

The UN has, after the resolution was passed, permitted Palestine to title its representative office to the UN as "The Permanent Observer Mission of the State of Palestine to the United Nations", seen by many as a reflection of the UN's de facto position of recognizing the State of Palestine's sovereignty under international law, and Palestine started to re-title its name accordingly on postal stamps, official documents and passports. The Palestinian authorities also instructed its diplomats to officially represent the "State of Palestine", as opposed to the "Palestine National Authority". Additionally, on 17 December 2012, UN Chief of Protocol Yeocheol Yoon decided that "the designation of "State of Palestine" shall be used by the Secretariat in all official United Nations documents", recognizing the "State of Palestine" as the official name of the Palestinian nation.

On 26 September 2013 at the United Nations, Mahmoud Abbas was given the right to sit in the General Assembly's beige chair which is reserved for heads of state waiting to take the podium and address the General Assembly.

Other positions

Diplomatic recognitions

UN member states
Of the  member states of the United Nations, . The list below is based on the list maintained by the Palestine Liberation Organization during the campaign for United Nations recognition in 2011, and maintained by the Permanent Observer Mission to the UN.

Some states, marked with an asterisk (*) below, expressly recognized the State of Palestine on the borders of 4 June 1967 (i.e., the West Bank, Gaza and East Jerusalem), which constituted Arab territory prior to the Six-Day War.

Not members of the UN

No diplomatic recognition

UN member states

Not members of the UN

Multilateral treaties
The State of Palestine is a party to several multilateral treaties, registered with five depositaries: the United Kingdom, UNESCO, United Nations, the Netherlands and Switzerland. The ratification of the UNESCO conventions took place in 2011/2012 and followed Palestine becoming a member of UNESCO, while the ratification of the other conventions were performed in 2014 while negotiations with Israel were in an impasse.

In an objection of 16 May 2014, Israel informed the Secretary General of the United Nations that it did not consider that 'Palestine' (single quotation marks in original) met the definition of statehood and that its requested accession to the United Nations Convention against Torture as being "without legal validity and without effect upon Israel's treaty relations under the Convention". The United States and Canada lodged similar objections.

Palestine participated in the negotiation of the UN Treaty on the Prohibition of Nuclear Weapons and voted in favour of its adoption on 7 July 2017.

See also
 List of states with limited recognition
 List of positions on Jerusalem
 Palestinian nationalism
 Proposals for a Palestinian state
 Palestine–European Union relations
Right to exist

Notes

References

External links
 Ministry of Foreign Affairs, Palestinian National Authority
 Negotiations Affairs Department, Palestine Liberation Organization
 Palestine State 194
 OneVoice Palestine

Palestine Liberation Organization
Palestinian nationalism
Diplomatic recognition